Traunstein is an electoral constituency (German: Wahlkreis) represented in the Bundestag. It elects one member via first-past-the-post voting. Under the current constituency numbering system, it is designated as constituency 225. It is located in southern Bavaria, comprising the districts of Berchtesgadener Land and Traunstein.

Traunstein was created for the inaugural 1949 federal election. Since 1990, it has been represented by Peter Ramsauer of the Christian Social Union (CSU).

Geography
Traunstein is located in southern Bavaria. As of the 2021 federal election, it comprises the districts of Berchtesgadener Land and Traunstein.

History
Traunstein was created in 1949. In the 1949 election, it was Bavaria constituency 11 in the numbering system. In the 1953 through 1961 elections, it was number 206. In the 1965 through 1998 elections, it was number 211. In the 2002 and 2005 elections, it was number 226. Since the 2009 election, it has been number 225.

Originally, the constituency comprised the independent cities of Traunstein and Bad Reichenhall and the districts of Landkreis Traunstein, Berchtesgaden, and Laufen. From 1976 through 1994, it comprised the districts of Traunstein and Berchtesgadener Land. In the 1998 and 2002 elections, it also contained the Verwaltungsgemeinschaft of Kirchweidach from the Altötting district. It acquired its current borders in the 2005 election.

Members
The constituency has been held by the Christian Social Union (CSU) during all but one Bundestag term since its creation. It was first represented by Sepp Parzinger of the Bavaria Party (BP) from 1949 to 1953. Wolfgang Klausner of the CSU won it in 1953 and served until 1961. Heinz Brenck was then representative from 1961 to 1969. Matthias Engelsberger served from 1969 to 1990. Peter Ramsauer was elected in 1990, and re-elected in 1994, 1998, 2002, 2005, 2009, 2013, 2017, and 2021.

Election results

2021 election

2017 election

2013 election

2009 election

References

Federal electoral districts in Bavaria
1949 establishments in West Germany
Constituencies established in 1949
Traunstein (district)
Berchtesgadener Land